The Melbourne Centennial Exhibition was organised to celebrate a century of European settlement in Australia. The Exhibition Building, constructed in 1880 for the Melbourne International Exhibition, was extended and reused. The Centennial Exhibition focused on Australia itself, and emphasised music and painting that attracted many visitors. However the Exhibition wasn't recognised by the Bureau of International Expositions (BIE) as a World's Fair.

References

1888 in Australia
1880s in Melbourne
World's fairs in Melbourne